Evelina "Eva" Palmer (January 9, 1874 – June 4, 1952) was an American woman notable for her study and promotion of Classical Greek culture, weaving, theater, choral dance and music. Palmer's life and artistic endeavors intersected with numerous noteworthy artists throughout her life. She was both inspired by or inspired the likes of dancers Isadora Duncan and Ted Shawn, the French literary great Colette, the poet and author Natalie Barney and the actress Sarah Bernhardt. She would go on to marry Angelos Sikelianos, a Greek poet and playwright. Together they organized a revival of the Delphic Festival in Delphi, Greece. Embodied in these festivals of art, music and theater she hoped to promote a balanced sense of enlightenment that would further the goals of peace and harmony in Greece and beyond.

Early life 
Evelina Palmer was born on January 9, 1874, at Gramercy Park in New York City to Courtlandt Palmer Sr. and Catherine Amory Bennett. She was one of five children in a family of eclectic intellectuals and gifted artists. The family she was born into was one that promoted liberal thought, unconventional education and exploration of music, theater and literature. Her earliest memories were of her father's Nineteenth Century Club, whose early meetings were held at the Palmer home. The Nineteenth Century Club brought together people of disparate political ideologies, atheists and religious luminaries. Her father facilitated thoughtful and amiable discussions of politics, religion and morality. These discussions were witnessed by a young Palmer and she would write later they would lay the seeds of her own thoughts as a young woman and adult. Her father died in the summer of 1888 of appendicitis. Palmer's mother would later remarry, to a man named Robert Abbe. It was during the family's summer vacations at Bar Harbor in Maine she became acquainted with Natalie Barney. The two shared an interest in poetry, literature and horseback riding. Barney likened Palmer to a medieval virgin, an homage to her ankle-length red hair and fair countenance. The two would become young lovers and later be neighbors in Paris.

Palmer's siblings were also formative in her life, in particular her brother Courtlandt Palmer Jr. Her brother was a musical prodigy and could at a young age play at the piano most all of the works of renowned composers.  As music was integral to their mother's life, all of the Palmer siblings were either exposed to or encouraged to pursue musical endeavors. She herself would go on to study independently, music theory and Greek choral arrangements.

Palmer was enrolled in various boarding schools and day schools sporadically and for brief periods of time. Her father established a short-lived experimental school called the Van Taube School. She herself was not enrolled but recalls its open format that encouraged creative minds to explore without a rigid curriculum. After coming of age Palmer would attend Bryn Mawr College. While at Bryn Mawr she studied literature and the theater arts. She left the school before completing a degree, choosing rather to join her brother Palmer Jr. in Rome for a year and to study independently.

Paris 
Palmer settled in Neuilly, an expatriate neighborhood near Paris. Palmer occupied herself fine-tuning her fluency of the French language, attending theater as well as participating in impromptu theatrical performances at fetes in Natalie Barney's backyard garden. At one of these fetes Palmer performed with Colette, Pierre Louÿs' Dialogue au Soleil Couchant. During this time she also met Sarah Bernhardt and the two became acquainted. Palmer was asked to perform with Sarah on-stage, an arrangement that ultimately fell through. During a brief foray in London, Palmer was offered to join the theater company of Mrs. Patrick Campbell. Mrs. Campbell's precondition to Palmer joining the company however demanded that she publicly disassociate herself with Natalie Barney. While the offer pleased Palmer and could have proven fruitful to her artistic endeavors, she ultimately turned down the offer. She was unwilling to forgo her friendship with Barney despite the opportunity.

It was also during Palmer's time in Paris she became acquainted with Raymond Duncan, the brother of Isadora Duncan, and his wife Penelope, the sister of Angelos Sikelianos. Due to labor unrest in Paris in 1905, the married couple and their baby came to stay with Palmer at her small house in Neuilly. Palmer and the couple shared an interest in homespun garb and Greek art. With the hopes of reproducing the quality of authentic Greek robes, the trio fashioned a loom to create several garments for themselves. These efforts would ultimately lead Palmer to abandoning traditional dress of the times in favor of dresses and handcrafted leather sandals she would come to fashion herself and wear exclusively. Penelope's singing and reciting of Sikelianos' poetry further intrigued Palmer. She wished to learn more and to meet Sikelianos herself. The Duncans and Palmer would later leave Paris for Greece.

Greece 
Palmer and the Duncans would settle for a time in the Grecian foothills of the Hymettos mountains, five miles east of Athens. The location was the unfinished remnants of the Duncan family home. It was here Penelope arranged for Palmer to meet her brother for the first time. Despite the language barrier Palmer and Sikelianos became acquainted, learning they shared a world view. Through their conversations regarding peace, debate and civility, much of it reminded her of her late father's debate society as well as her own formed opinions on the world. It was during this time the seeds for reviving the Delphic Idea and the Delphic Festival was laid. Both Palmer and Sikelianos sought to bring people together and through the devices of art, music and theater share their message of harmony among people of different ethnic, religious and political backgrounds.

Palmer followed Sikelianos to Lefkas, the Ionian island on the Western coast of Greece and his ancestral home. Here the two became further acquainted. He shared with her his poetry and they discussed in further depth the Delphic Idea. Palmer had built for her a loom so she could further pursue her interest in weaving homespun dresses in the style of the Greeks. In 1907 Palmer and Sikelianos traveled to America. Palmer was unprepared for the American press interest in her and especially in her chosen mode of dress. As her dress departed from the more typical and Parisian fashions dramatically, the New York newspapers found in Palmer, an heiress of her father's infamous reputation, ample material to write upon. Palmer eschewed the attention and was angered at the often false stories written about her. The purpose of their visit however was to introduce Palmer's mother to Sikelianos and to get married. The couple was married in Bar Harbor, Maine, on September 9, 1907. Palmer assumed a hyphenated surname: Eva Palmer-Sikelianos. Her friendship with Barney did not survive this union. Barney feared the loss of Palmer in Sikelianos, while Palmer tired of life in Paris, a lifestyle she increasingly saw as frivolous. Their friendship would later be repaired by an exchange of letters and would later reunite as a friends.

Returning to Greece, the couple settled in Athens. Here Palmer gave birth to a son named Glafkos. The family also maintained a small residence in Lefkas where they would vacation, explore the beaches and fish. She would also begin studying Greek Ecclesiastical music and notation under Konstantinos Psachos, at the time named by the Ecumenical Patriarch of Constantinople as Master Teacher of Music of the Great Church of Christ. Palmer's interest was in the complexity of Greek music as it cannot be recorded in notation in the same fashion as Modern music. To do so required learning Byzantine music notation. Palmer's scholarly pursuits in music instilled in her a desire to form a school whose purpose would be to preserve Greek indigenous music. Additionally, using her own funds as well as organizing donation drives, she and Psachos would raise the money necessary to commission the creation of a specialized harmonium. The instrument was manufactured and named by Psachos the Evion Panharmonium after its most significant sponsor Velimirović,  While the original Evion Panharmonium was believed to later be destroyed during World War II, two smaller versions were brought back to Greece by Psachos. Her goal of forming a school of music in Athens was laid to rest while other projects diverted her time and attention.

The relationship between Eva and Angelos is described by Takis Dimopoulos, a very close friend of Angelos and person that understood his work, in his article titled "The poet and Eva" Dimopoulos, initially deals with their relationship as secretly prepared for long and almost predetermined by fate. Angelos (who, at the time he met Palmer was in his prime both spiritually and mentally, “a young bull”, a young Dionysus and fabulous Adonis” from the "warm bosom of Mother Earth") and Eva, both urged to mate by the poet’s sister Penelope, are considered as two symbols: "[...] we have [...] the man, whose bowels are burning with desire for the Eternal female [...] and the woman who, like a crystal interacts with the "Male Speech" in many levels. [...]. "Sikelianos, after their acquaintance, travels to Egypt (where he writes his work “Alafroiskiotos" (The Light-Shadowed) and, when he returned to Lefkada, he gets into a relationship with her, which would soon lead to marriage. Eva as the new "Homeric Penelope", due to the waiting for his return, changes her spiritual targeting and recognizes the priority that a loyal attitude and focus on the vision of the great poet has: she becomes the "thirsty receiver" of unrestrained "bacchic" erotic and mystic intoxication, sets aside every obstacle that gets in his way (material or otherwise), guides him and supports him in difficult times (death of Penelope), in a word, she is trying to assure that he will remain undisturbed from anything will could stand in his course. He, in turn, tries to understand the Greek tradition, he knows the "great Mystics" of all cultures and times and is increasingly developing his "innate secretive mood" and the "first image of Mother Nature" in him. This spiritual quest ends with the birth of the Delphic Idea, the new concept for Delphi by Sikelianos. This idea will rush through him in a Dionysian and lyrical way.  He wants to change the Present (a political act – in the broader meaning of the term) with “the Love for the Other person” as the means. Eva plays a very important role in this quest and essentially manages to become a “true Greek Bacchant”, she deals with all the organizational, practical and material aspects of the Festivals, allowing Angelos to be devoted to his vision. Her offer, however, is very important (she composes music for the chorus of the tragedies and sews the dresses for the dancers according to ancient Greek standards). Even with such fatigue and responsibility, things are going well and the Festivals (both) are successful. However, the money needed for the conduct of the Delphic Festivals were many and there is need for new resources, so Eva is obliged to return home. Her efforts to find financial resources and partners were long and fruitless and eventually failed. Angelos, influenced by her absence (which resulted in the cancellation of their wedding in 1934 and their separation), turned to another 'first image’" of the "Mother", trying to divert somewhere else his torrential Dionysian vision which is "affected" by the existential questions that have begun to torture him. This period of "existential" -almost- loneliness ends in 1938, when he met Anna Karamani, his future wife. Eva had become successively Daughter (the "intellectual exercise"), Wife ("fulfilling the Dionysian visions") and Sister, and now had reached the highest stage of this unique development: she became the Mother, who from afar tries to relieve her son of the final course to fulfill the "great longing", while she is alone and mourning. This is Eva’s role now in relation to Angelos, who asks her consent to his marriage with Anna (she "gives her blessings"). Ultimately, she turned back to her "spiritual home", Greece, only when her Dionysus had returned to his Mother, so that she would stay forever in Delphi.

First Delphic Festival 
The first Delphic Festival organized by Palmer and her husband commenced May 9, 1927. Events were planned over the course of several days. These included a production of the Greek tragedy Prometheus Bound, performed amid the ruins of the theater at Delphi, an athletic competition at the stadium, and an assembly of local handicrafts in the nearby village. Preparations for the festival began nearly three years prior and featured both setbacks and unexpected successes. Organizing such an event required time, effort and money. The sponsorship and cooperation of the Greek government, educational institutions, businesses and interest groups was sought. Palmer used both her own inheritance as well as secured loans for the necessary money needed to execute the festival. Along the way she encountered apathy, outright disapproval and sometimes encouragement and support. Palmer's primary task was the production of Prometheus Bound, which involved directing the play, training the Greek chorus, and weaving all of the costumes from scratch. Psachos was recruited to produce the music for the play as she felt only he understood the true nature of the music required to imbue the performance with authenticity. Much to her dismay however Psachos insisted on the inclusion of an accompanying orchestra of musicians. Greek theatrical performances of antiquity did not feature such orchestras nor did the layout of the theater accommodate it. She felt that the theater production necessitated an authentic representation and to deviate from the authenticity would elicit an inaccurate production of the play and the overall message of the Delphic Festival would be marred. Despite her misgivings, the instrumental orchestra was included. To her relief and surprise the accompanying music of the orchestra was largely inaudible given the design of the theater. While she did not consider herself the sole source of accuracy and authenticity on Greek tragedy and chorus, she felt she had learned enough on the topics to know that there was no one alive who was. And so she set about the production relying on both her background in these studies as well as by instinct. A feature of the athletic performances was the Pyrrhic Dance, men dressed in armor dancing and keeping time by stomping their feet. Finding enough dedicated men to perform this dance, as well as creating the breastplates, helmets, swords and spears, was a monumental task. Coming to the rescue was the Greek Ministry of War and Alexandros Mazarakis-Ainian, who placed at her disposal all the men she needed for the Pyrrhic Dance as well as tents, trucks, and other supplies needed to carry out the festival.

The festival concluded successfully. The play and athletic competitions were recorded by the Greek filmmaker Dimitrios Gaziadis. The film was titled Prometheus in Chains and was reproduced in 1971. Press reports throughout Greece and Europe wrote positively of the festival and many previously disposed as skeptical of the idea were convinced otherwise.

Second Delphic Festival 
The positive reception of the first festival ensured the cooperation of the Greek government for subsequent festivals. It was decided that a national lottery would be formed to both pay off the debts of the first and pay for the second Delphic Festival. Public support for the festival was high and the government passed the Delphic Lottery bill. At the time Greece had one lottery whose returns were divided between funding the country's archaeological endeavors and to the Greek Navy, but when it came time to print the tickets for the lottery, the effort was stymied. The Minister of the Navy apparently was at blame for the holdup, fearing that funds people spent on lottery tickets would go the festival rather than in support of the Navy. Disillusioned with this setback, Palmer traveled to America for approximately a year. She was asked to lecture at various schools, colleges and universities and wrote several papers on the topics embodied in the festival and the Delphic Idea. Palmer traveled from coast to coast and back again to New England. The lecturing tour afforded only a modest financial return and she largely bore her own travel expenses. She was asked to stay on and teach at Yale University the Greek choruses she had directed in Prometheus Bound. She turned down the offer however, feeling she would be unable to teach such things in an authentic and sustaining manner.

Palmer returned to Europe, staying in Paris for a time before being convinced to return to Greece in the autumn of 1929 and commence the planning of the second Delphic Festival. It is unclear if the issue of the Delphic Lottery and the Ministry of the Navy was resolved and how the festival would be paid for; if by the lottery, loans or by Palmer's own money. Her concerns regarding debt still owed from the first festival lend evidence to the unlikelihood she had sufficient funds herself to pay for all the costs of a second festival. Nevertheless she returned to Greece and planning for the second festival began. She and Sikelianos decided on The Suppliants as the featured play. This play featured the Greek Chorus as the centerpiece and antagonist of the play, and as such she dove into the preparations fully. Fifty chorus performers were needed and unlike the early struggles of the first festival, volunteers were plenty and enthusiastic. The Greek Ministry of War also again provided ready support in men and materials for the festival. The irony of this was not lost on Palmer. Though such an organization was preoccupied with the business of war, the very antithesis of the Delphic Idea, she reasoned who more than any knew the horrors of war than soldiers.

Psacos was again asked to write the music for the play and the old arguments from the first festival were revisited. She was given more of a free hand to decide upon the particulars of the production than before and Psachos and Palmer disagreed on the musical elements of the play. The two would not speak again and Psachos withdrew from the production. Both the athletic competitions and an exhibition of handicrafts were again part of the festival. The festival took place in 1930 and was a success.

Parallel to the Delphic Idea was the idea of a Delphic University, promoted largely by Sikelianos. Following on the success of the two festivals it was hoped such a school could be put together. The Greek government however did not warm to the idea and rather was more interested in how future festivals could promote Greek products and tourism. To Palmer and Sikelianos the festivals were but one means to an end and not the end itself. As such the Greek government was of little help beyond the promotion of the festivals. Tourism and the export of Greek wares could infuse the economy, whereas the studious pursuit of the Delphic Idea would not, in the eyes of the government, garner any returns in the foreseeable future.

Palmer would again return to America with hopes of stirring interest in the Delphic Idea and the lessons of Greek Tragedy and Drama. Her marriage with Sikelianos would be annulled in 1934 and he would later remarry in Greece. They continued to exchange correspondence and remained on good terms.

America 
Palmer renewed her theatrical efforts in America. She was invited to join the Federal Theater Project in New York, a New Deal program to employ out-of-work artists, writers and directors. Under this project Palmer endeavored to produce The Persians by Aeschylus, which featured a chorus of fifty men. It was Palmer's desire to produce such a play that featured male dancers and singers, believing that such participation furthered the precepts of the Delphic Idea. Palmer was also involved in the production of a Christmas play, as well as in the writing and production of a comedy based on a Greek play by Aristophanes. None of these efforts however came to fruition. The competing agendas and in-fighting between committees and sub-committees of the Federal Theater Project, as well as an uneven participation and dedication by a motley crew of tap-dancers, vaudeville stars and circus performers she was given to work with, undermined Palmer's efforts. She was eventually dismissed from the program. Frustrated and disappointed, Palmer moved on. In the spring of 1938 she would give a lecture to a Greek society group called Philiko where she announced her intention on teaching The Persians. Participation was limited to four interested individuals.

Not long after Palmer developed a severe condition of pneumonia and was interred in bed for an extended period of time. This was a time of rest and introspection for Palmer. She maintained correspondence with her various friends and family, read and wrote until she recovered and was well enough again to pursue more active interests. For a time Palmer would stay with a friend in Greenwich, Connecticut.

In January 1939, Palmer took in a dance production at Irving Washington High School in New York, Dance of Ages by Ted Shawn and his company of male dancers. Her previous experiences with male dancers of this sort had not been positive. They were either entrenched in American style of dancing or unwilling to learn the Greek chorus methods. What she witnessed in Shawn and his production was akin to the style and spirit of what she sought. Shawn was familiar with Palmer's efforts and the two agreed to make time to discuss their particular endeavors. They quickly found they shared an understanding of dance and music. The two would collaborate the following years. Palmer would teach Shawn's dance troupe her interpretation of Greek chorus as well as produce costumes from her loom. In Shawn's group of dancers she found at long last a rapt audience and interested students. Shawn and Palmer would go on to produce several numbers that were seen in New York and Florida. Later they would arrive at an impasse and artistic disagreement that ultimately led to the end of their partnership.

Upward Panic 
Upward Panic is both the title of Palmer's autobiography and a term she coined herself. The autobiography was assembled and edited by John P. Anton, Professor of Greek Philosophy and Culture at the University of South Florida. The autobiography is the fourth volume in a series of books that make up the Choreography and Dance Studies program and published by Harwood Academic Publishers in 1993. Professor Anton received a grant in 1985 which allowed him to travel to Greece and research what could be learned of Palmer there. She began writing her autobiography in 1938 and would continue to do so on and off again through 1948. The book is roughly divided into two parts, the first being more traditionally autobiographical where she speaks to her early life and family. The second half concerns accounts of the Delphic Festivals, her later experiences in America and theoretical essays.

Upward Panic as a term coined by Palmer describes the rising exhilaration experienced at the culmination of tragic drama, music and dance. She and Sikelianos believed that the pursuit of these arts would lead people towards peace and understanding of each other. The term itself has its roots in Arcadia, Greek Mythology and of Pan, from which the English word 'panic' is derived from. Use of the word panic in this context should not be confused with the negative connotation it holds in modern English.

Death and legacy 
Palmer returned to Greece in the spring of 1952. Two weeks after her arrival she suffered a fatal stroke while attending a theatrical performance in Delphi. She was 78 years old. Pursuant to her wishes she was buried at Delphi.

Palmer's artistic endeavors and support of the Delphic Idea came in a period of time between world wars. In her latter years she would witness from afar the rise of Nazism, Hitler and WWII. It would seem as though their efforts had been all for naught. They were not the first to attempt a revival of the spirit of Delphi in Greece and they would not be the last. The Delphic Idea lives on in modern times through the International Delphic Council. Much of the same ideals and principals are embodied in these modern efforts of music, dance and athletics.

Notes

References 

 Angelos Sikelianos, Letters to Eva Palmer Sikelianos, Edited by Kostas Bournazakis, Ikaros Publisher, Athens 2008 
 Eva Palmer Sikelianos, Upward Panic – The Autobiography of Eva Palmer-Sikelianos, Edited By John P. Anton. Hardwood Academic Publishers, 1993 
 Suzanne Rodriquez, Wild Heart – Natalie Clifford Barney and the Decadence of Literary Paris, Harper Collins, 2003 (Ecco Paperback Edition) 
 Judith Thurman, Secrets of the Flesh: A life of Colette, Random House Publishing Group (Ballantine Books), 1999 
 Kenneth MacKinnon, Greek Tragedy into Film, Fairleigh Dickinson University Press, 1986 
 Egon Wellesz, Miloš Velimirović, Studies in Eastern Chant, Volume 5, Edited By Dimitri Conomos. St. Vladimir's Press, 1990

Further reading 

 “Greek Poet's Wife to Talk on Delphi.” The San Francisco Examiner, 17 June 1928, p. 56. Newspapers.com.
Artemis Leontis, Eva Palmer Sikelianos: A Life in Ruins, Princeton University Press, 2019.

External links 

 Artemis Leontis,The Alternative Archaeologies of Eva Palmer Sikelianos
 International Delphic Council
 Modern Chronology of Delphic Festival (394 AD to 2007)
 International Delphic Council (2008+)

Dance historians
American art historians
Women art historians
American choreographers
1874 births
1952 deaths
19th-century American women
20th-century American women
People from Gramercy Park
LGBT people from New York (state)
LGBT choreographers
Historians from New York (state)
Bisexual women
Angelos Sikelianos